Wenshou or zoomorphic ornaments are statues of dragons and other animals, that are found on the roofs of Chinese temples, palaces, and homes. Examples of Wenshou as Imperial roof decoration are found within the Imperial Palace Museum of the Forbidden City, Beijing, China.

Architecture in China